Hanslia is a genus of flowering plants belonging to the family Fabaceae.

Its native range is Malesia to Vanuatu.

Species:
 Hanslia ormocarpoides (DC.) H.Ohashi

References

Desmodieae
Fabaceae genera